Damburneya mirafloris is a species of plant in the family Lauraceae. It is endemic to Nicaragua.

References

mirafloris
Endemic flora of Nicaragua
Taxonomy articles created by Polbot